Enloe may refer to:
 
Enloe, Texas, an unincorporated community in Delta County
William G. Enloe High School, public high school in Raleigh, North Carolina
Enloe Dam and Powerplant, a powerplant in Okanogan County, Washington

Persons with the surname Enloe
Benjamin A. Enloe (1848–1922), U.S. Congressman from Tennessee 
William G. Enloe (1902–1972), mayor of Raleigh, North Carolina
Cynthia Enloe (b. 1938), feminist writer
Jason Enloe (b. 1974), professional golfer